Thomas Röwekamp (born 18 September 1966 in Bremerhaven) is a German lawyer and politician of the Christian Democratic Union (CDU) who has been serving as a member of the Bundestag since 2021.

From 1991 to 2021, Röwekamp was a member of the State Parliament of Bremen. From 2007 he was his parliamentary group's chairman. In the government of Henning Scherf, Röwekamp was Senator and under the government of Jens Böhrnsen vice-major of Bremen.

Political career

Career in state politics
Röwekamp served as Bremen's State Minister of the interior in the governments of successive Mayors Henning Scherf and Jens Böhrnsen from 2003 to November 2005. During his time in office, he initiated cost-saving structural changes within the Bremen Police.

In early January 2005 the 35-year-old Laye-Alama Condé from Sierra Leone vomited four cocaine globules at the police station in Bremen and drowned the forced influx of water. Röwekamp took the political responsibility for the award of emetics to suspected drug dealers. He justified the so-called Brechmitteleinsatz with the words, "heavy criminal" would have to "expect physical disadvantages."

Röwekamp co-chaired the CDU’s national conventions in Dresden (2006) and Karlsruhe (2010).

In the 2007 state elections, Röwekamp unsuccessfully challenged incumbent Jens Böhrnsen as mayor.

Röwekamp was a CDU delegate to the Federal Convention for the purpose of electing the President of Germany in 2009.

Member of the German Parliament, 2021–present
In parliament, Röwekamp has been serving on the Defence Committee.

Personal life
Röwekamp and his family live in Bremerhaven.

References

1966 births
Living people
Politicians from Bremen
Members of the Bürgerschaft of Bremen
Members of the Bundestag 2021–2025